Wen Yiduo (24 November 189915 July 1946) was a Chinese poet and scholar known for his nationalistic poetry. Wen was assassinated by the Kuomintang in 1946.

Life
Wen Yiduo was born Wén Jiāhuá on 24 November 1899 in what is now Xishui County in Hubei Province. After receiving a traditional Chinese Confucian education he went on to continue studying at Tsinghua University.

In 1922, he traveled to the United States to study fine arts and literature at the Art Institute of Chicago. It was during this time that his first collection of poetry, Hongzhu ("Red Candle"), was published. In 1925, he traveled back to China and took a university teaching post. In 1928, his second collection, Sishui  ("Dead Water"), was published. In the same year he joined the Crescent Moon Society and wrote essays on poetry. He also began to publish the results of his classical Chinese literature research.

At the outbreak of the Second Sino-Japanese War, he and many other intellectuals from northeastern China migrated  to Kunming, Yunnan.  There he was able to continue to teach, this time in the wartime National Southwestern Associated University.  Wen stopped writing poetry in 1931 and became increasingly involved in social criticism. He became politically active in 1944 in support of the China Democratic League. His outspoken nature led to his assassination by secret agents of the Kuomintang after eulogizing his friend Li Gongpu's life at Li's funeral in 1946.

There is a monument to Wen at the Yunnan Normal University campus in Kunming, as well as a large statue.  A small memorial to him, including a wall portrait painted from a famous picture of him smoking his pipe is found in a walkway by his former home (the site is now part of an elementary school) in the Green Lake area of Kunming. He and his wife, Gao Zhen, are buried at the Babaoshan Revolutionary Cemetery in Beijing.

Poetry
Wen's poetry is noted for its experimentation with classical Chinese rules and forms.  He modeled his poetry on that of the English poets John Keats, Alfred Tennyson, and Robert Browning, and tried to "recapture the symbolism and ethos of premodern Chinese society".  The poems in his second collection, Dead Water (Sǐshuǐ ), have "a haunting musicality", and deal with the "heartrendingly heavy" subject of exposing social injustice and corruption.

Scholarship
Wen was credited by David Hawkes as the initiator of the cult of Qu Yuan as "China's first patriotic poet", writing that, "although Qu Yuan did not write about the life of the people or voice their sufferings, he may truthfully be said to have acted as the leader of a people's revolution and to have struck a blow to avenge them. Qu Yuan is the only person in the whole of Chinese history who is fully entitled to be called 'the people's poet'."

Family 
Wen's eldest grandson, Wen Liming, was a researcher of modern history at the Chinese Academy of Social Sciences. He studied modern Chinese history, including his grandfather's travels to Chicago, and collected and donated a number of materials about Wen Yiduo to National Southwestern Associated University (presently Yunnan Normal University.

References

Citations

Works cited

 .
 .
 .
 .
 .
 .

Portrait 
    Wen Yiduo. A Portrait by Kong Kai Ming at Portrait Gallery of Chinese Writers (Hong Kong Baptist University Library).

External links

WEN I-TO
Wen Yiduo

1899 births
1946 deaths
Republic of China poets
Modern Chinese poetry
Chinese non-fiction writers
School of the Art Institute of Chicago alumni
Tsinghua University alumni
Academic staff of Tsinghua University
Academic staff of the National Southwestern Associated University
Boxer Indemnity Scholarship recipients
Assassinated Chinese people
Deaths by firearm in China
People murdered in China
People from Huanggang
Poets from Hubei
20th-century poets
20th-century Chinese male writers
Burials at Babaoshan Revolutionary Cemetery
Male non-fiction writers
National Wuhan University alumni